Jason Cohen is an American filmmaker. Cohen was nominated for an Academy Award for Best Documentary (Short Subject) for the 2013 film Facing Fear. In January 2020, the Cohen won the Directors Guild of America Award for Reality Programs for "Encore!", which he directed for Disney+.

References

External links

American documentary filmmakers
Living people
Year of birth missing (living people)
Place of birth missing (living people)